The Sony Alpha 99 was announced by Sony on September 12, 2012. It was the flagship Sony DSLR camera and of the Sony Alpha SLT line until late 2016 when it was replaced by the Sony α99 II.

It features the 24.3MP 35mm full-frame Exmor APS HD CMOS sensor, with the normal sensor range of ISO 100–3200. The selectable sensitivity is up to ISO 25600, which makes this camera able to capture still images in low-light environments. This camera can also combine six images together, to generate a single image with two additional steps of ISO sensitivity.  This is also the first Sony Alpha camera to use the new Sony "Mult-Interface" shoe which is a standard ISO shoe with proprietary contacts at the front of the shoe.  This allows use of standard ISO hotshoe accessories without the need for adapters as in previous Alpha models.  The camera ships with an adapter to allow use of older Minolta-style hot-shoe accessories.

Like Sony's APS-c flagship, α77, the α99 has the ability to record Full HD 1080 video with up to 60p frame rate. In markets outside China, this camera also has built-in GPS that allows recording of position information into the photo. The α99 also uses a three-way tiltable LCD, as used on α77, this feature allows the photographer to view the LCD from any angle.  Alongside the lens mount Sony has replaced the traditional autofocus mode selection dial with a "Silent Multi-Controller" which is a customizable dial with silent detents and a central button used for confirmation.  The dial's function can be brought up with a press of the central button and then changed using the dial silently during movie or still recording.  The dial's functions can also be changed on the fly by long-pressing the button and then selecting whichever function is desired.

For flexibility Sony α99 allows users to use Sony's crop APS-C DT lenses and consequently automatically cropping the image to the smaller frame.

An updated version, the Sony α99 II, was announced at Photokina in September 2016.

Model variants
Model variants of the Alpha 99 camera body:
 SLT-A99V with GPS.
 SLT-A99 without GPS (depending on country).

Hasselblad HV 
In February 2014, Hasselblad introduced a restyled Sony A99 as Hasselblad HV. According to the company's press-release, their version of A99 is "tough as nails", featuring more robust construction than the original.

Features

Image and autofocus
 24.3MP 35mm full-frame Exmor APS HD CMOS sensor.
 Updated BIONZ image processor.
 A dual AF System (19+ 102 points, 11 cross type).
 1200-zone evaluative exposure metering.
 TTL phase-detection auto focusing.

ISO
 ISO sensitivity 100–25600.

Ergonomy
 TruFinder XGA OLED Electronic viewfinder with 100% frame coverage.

Performance 
In the DxOMark Overall Sensor Score test, which is based on all characteristics of a camera sensor, the Sony Alpha 99 scores 89 points, which equals the score of the Nikon D4 and the Phase One P65 Plus medium format camera, with the Nikon D800E, D800 and D600 being the only digital SLRs that get a higher score. Therefore, as of September 2013, the Sony Alpha 99 scores higher than all DSLRs from Canon and all DSLRs except those listed here from Nikon, including their professional models.

See also 
Sony α99 II (ILCA-99M2) (successor model)

References 

99
Cameras introduced in 2012
Live-preview digital cameras
Full-frame DSLR cameras